The 2014–15 División de Honor B, the XVII edition, began on September 13, 2014 with the first matchday of regular season and finished on May 23, 2015 with the Promotion playoffs final. For 2014–15 season, the championship expands to 3 groups of 10/12 teams each.

Alcobendas Rugby won the promotion playoff to Sant Cugat 18–13 and returned to División de Honor three years after of relegation.

Competition format
The season comprises Main stage or regular season, 2nd stage and Final. The regular season runs through 22 matchdays (groups A and C) and 18 matchdays  (Group B). Upon completion the regular season, the two top teams of each group qualify for 2nd stage. 2nd stage features two groups of three teams each, in a round-robin format, playing each team 4 matches in total. Top team of each group play the Final with the winner team being promoted to División de Honor while the loser team play the promotion playoff against the team qualified 11th in División de Honor. Teams qualified in 10th, 11th & 12th in the standings play the relegation playoff to Primera Nacional.

Points during regular season are awarded as following;

Each win means 4 points to winning team.
A draw means 2 points for each team.
1 bonus point for a team that achieves 4 tries in a match.
A defeat by 7 or less points means 1 bonus point for defeated team.

Teams

Group A
Teams from northern section of Spain

Group B
Teams from eastern section of Spain

Group C
Teams from southern section of Spain

Standings

Regular season

Group A

Group B

Group C

2nd phase

Group A

Group B

Final

Sant Cugat play the relegation/promotion playoff against FC Barcelona.

Scorers statistics

Top try scorers

Top points scorers

See also
2014–15 División de Honor de Rugby

References

External links
Federación Española de Rugby

2014–15
B